The 2003–04 season was Levski Sofia's 82nd season in the First League. This article shows player statistics and all matches (official and friendly) that the club will play during the 2003–04 season.

First-team squad
Squad at end of season

Competitions

A Group

Table

Results summary

Results by round

Fixtures and results

Bulgarian Cup

Levski advanced to Round 3 with 4–1 on aggregate.

Levski advanced to Quarterfinals with 6–3 on aggregate.

Levski are eliminated from the competition with 4–1 on aggregate.

UEFA Cup

Qualifying round

First round

Second round

Third round

References

External links 
 2003–04 Levski Sofia season

PFC Levski Sofia seasons
Levski Sofia